David Bowles may refer to:

 David Bowles (politician) (born 1944), representative in Maine, US
 David Bowles (chief executive), public official in Lincolnshire, UK